Never Wave at a WAC is a 1953 American comedy film directed by Norman Z. McLeod, and starring Rosalind Russell, Paul Douglas and Marie Wilson.

Plot
Divorced socialite Jo McBain, daughter of United States Senator Reynolds, would like to join her boyfriend in Paris where he has been transferred with two other military comrades. She speaks with her father, who has the idea of her joining the army and getting her an officer's commission in the Women's Army Corps so she can be transferred to Paris. He sells her this idea, telling her that she would start as a general. Her wealthy and spoiled manners are crushed immediately, when she arrives at basic training camp she discovers that she is to start at the bottom. Her father is involved in the telephone chain of people making the decision.

Her ex-husband Andrew McBain is working as an Army uniforms designer and he uses his position to disrupt her romantic plans by making her join a group of girls who are testing polar equipment. After she has had enough of her ex-husband's silly pranks, she blows up at her commanding officers and is to be dismissed from the Army. Her contrite ex-husband admits his faults to the disciplinary hearing, but Jo confesses that she was faking being a good soldier so she could go to Paris and be with her boyfriend. She leaves the Army, but she makes a lifelong friend in Clara, who tells Jo she will ask her boyfriend to marry her. When she leaves the Army, Jo watches as new recruits are brought in. She realizes that she's still in love with her ex-husband (and he with her). She decides to reenlist back into the Army, a genuine attempt at being a good soldier this time, willing to do what the Army asks her to do. She says that later, after her graduation, she may be stationed near Andrew, her ex-husband.

Cast
Rosalind Russell as Jo McBain
Paul Douglas as Andrew McBain
Marie Wilson as Clara Schneiderman / Danger O'Dowd
William Ching as Lt. Col. Schuyler 'Sky' Fairchild 
Arleen Whelan as Sgt. Toni Wayne
 Leif Erickson as 	Sgt. Norbert 'Noisy' Jackson
 Hillary Brooke as 	First Lt. Phyllis Turnbull
 Charles Dingle as Sen. Tom Reynolds
 Lurene Tuttle as Capt. Murchinson
 Regis Toomey as 	Gen. Ned Prager
 Frieda Inescort as 	Lily Mae Gorham
 Louise Beavers as 	Artamesa
 Omar N. Bradley as Himself
 Vince Townsend Jr. as 	Henry
 Helen Foster as 	Capt. Finch 
 Marjorie Bennett as Mrs. Martha Pratt 
 Louise Lorimer as 	Col. Fullbright
 Lucia Carroll as 	Lt. Kohler 
 Barbara Woodell as Capt. Smith 
 Virginia Christine as 	Lt. Myles

See also
 The WAC from Walla Walla
Private Benjamin

References

External links

1953 films
Films directed by Norman Z. McLeod
Military humor in film
1953 comedy films
American comedy films
American black-and-white films
1950s English-language films
1950s American films
Women's Army Corps